Itapirubá is located in Imbituba, state of Santa Catarina, Brazil, sharing borders with Laguna. It is close to historical cities like Laguna, Imbituba and other sights. Itapirubá has beautiful beaches, dunes and a lake. There are two beaches separated by a hill; from the hill a headland and the island Ilha das Araras can be seen. The clear waters around the Ilha are a popular fishing and diving location.

Itapirubá's name is a translation from an Indian word, meaning means "stones that roll to the water."

References

Neighbourhoods in Santa Catarina (state)
Beaches of Brazil